James Kyrle MacCurdy, born James Kyrle McCurdy (May 20, 1875 – December 5, 1923) was a theater actor and playwright. He married actress Kate Woods Fiske (who also wrote under the pen name Katharine Wald) and lived in Brentwood, New York. In 1907 he wrote Yankee Doodle Detective. He wrote the 1915 play A Little Girl in the Big City that was made into the 1925 silent film A Little Girl in a Big City. He also wrote the 1917 play Broken Hearts of Broadway that was made into the 1923 silent film Broken Hearts of Broadway produced and directed by Irving Cummings and starring Colleen Moore. He also wrote the Old Clothes Man 1918. He also wrote and performed in Pedro, the Italian.

He was born in Stockton, California. He acted for stock companies on the west coast then moved east and performed as the principal actor in Augustin Daly's comedy A Night Off. He then worked for the Thanhouser Company. He died of accidental asphysixiation from a broken heater.

References

External links
Findagrave entry

1875 births
1923 deaths
American dramatists and playwrights
American stage actors